This is a partial list of fictional private investigators — also known as private eyes or PIs — who have appeared in various works of literature, film, television, and games.

References

Private investigators
Lists